The 1948 United States presidential election in North Carolina took place on November 2, 1948, as part of the 1948 United States presidential election. North Carolina voters chose 14 representatives, or electors, to the Electoral College, who voted for president and vice president.

Background
As a former Confederate state, North Carolina had a history of Jim Crow laws, disfranchisement of its African-American population and dominance of the Democratic Party in state politics. However, unlike the Deep South, the Republican Party had sufficient historic Unionist white support from the mountains and northwestern Piedmont to gain one-third of the statewide vote total in most general elections, where turnout was higher than elsewhere in the former Confederacy due substantially to the state’s early abolition of the poll tax in 1920. Like Virginia, Tennessee and Oklahoma, the relative strength of Republican opposition meant that North Carolina did not have statewide white primaries, although certain counties did use the white primary. Consequently, local response to the landmark 1944 court case of Smith v. Allwright was generally calm.

Nevertheless, the state was highly dissatisfied with the influence of blacks and labor unions on the national Democratic Party, and was initially satisfied when liberal Vice-President Henry A. Wallace was replaced on the Democratic ticket in 1944. However, by the beginning of 1946 most white North Carolinians were disapproving of President Truman, primarily because he appointed the first black federal judge and made overtures – though symbolic – toward civil rights. When Truman actually developed a proposal for black civil rights titled To Secure These Rights, however, North Carolina was the only Southern state where there was relatively little overt anger, and the state provided the only three votes from the former Confederacy for Truman as Democratic nominee during the party’s 1948 National Convention. Combined with the persistent local Republican threat from mountain Unionist descendants, this meant that there was never any question of the state Democratic Party supporting South Carolina Governor Strom Thurmond.

Vote
North Carolina was won by incumbent President Harry S. Truman (D–Missouri), running with Senator Alben W. Barkley, with 58.02 percent of the popular vote, against Governor Thomas Dewey (R–New York), running with Governor Earl Warren, with 32.68 percent of the popular vote.  North Carolina was the worst former Confederate state for Thurmond, and one of only two, the other being Texas, in which he did not win at least one county. Because the Black Belt of the state, unlike the economically conservative Black Belts of the Deep South, was economically more liberal than the Piedmont region where the establishment Democratic faction led since 1929 by O. Max Gardner was based, its entirely white electorate stayed exceedingly loyal to Truman. The greatest support for Thurmond was instead found in middle- and upper-class urban areas of the Piedmont, to such an extent that the best Dixiecrat counties correlated strongly with the largest urban areas.

, this is the last election in which Cabarrus County voted for a Democratic presidential candidate. This is also the last time a Democratic candidate won North Carolina by at least 15 points.

Results

Results by county

Notes

References

North Carolina
1948
1948 North Carolina elections